"Do You Remember These" is a song written by Don Reid, Harold Reid and Larry Lee, and recorded by American country music group The Statler Brothers.  It was released in March 1972 as the first single from the album Innerview.  The song reached No. 2 on the Billboard Hot Country Singles & Tracks chart, and No. 1 on the Cashbox Country Top 100.  "Do You Remember These" was also The Statler Brothers sole entry on the Easy Listening chart, where it peaked at No. 18.

Background
The song was a landmark-of-sorts for the Statlers, as they began recording songs appealing to nostalgia. While part of that repertoire included covers of oldies and standards, several of their other biggest hits had lyrics that recalled good times of years past.

In the case of "Do You Remember These", the Statlers recall post-war (late 1940s through the 1950s) popular culture and good times in the form of a list song. Pop culture references include Saturday morning serials, big-screen cowboy heroes including Gene Autry and Roy Rogers, flat top haircuts, Studebakers, radio programs including The Shadow and Your Hit Parade, aviator and coonskin caps, penny loafers, Howdy Doody, early rock and roll music (including "Tutti Fruitti," white bucks and "Blue Suede Shoes"), The Whip at amusement parks, sock hops and the Sadie Hawkins dance, "Veronica and Betty," and celebrities of the time, such as Charles Atlas and James Dean. Other references are of carefree life in general, such as lemonade stands, root beer floats and knock knock jokes; and various social conventions ("Judy's mom" and "ask daddy for the keys").

The song caused some unpleasantness for the group in Britain, due to the reference to "knickers to your knees," meaning short pants or Knickerbockers.  In the UK, the phrase is taken to refer to women's underpants.

The nostalgia theme would continue in several other Statler Brothers songs, including "The Movies" (1977) and "Child of the Fifties" (1983).

Chart performance

References

1972 singles
The Statler Brothers songs
Songs written by Don Reid (singer)
Songs written by Harold Reid
Song recordings produced by Jerry Kennedy
Mercury Records singles
1972 songs
Songs about nostalgia
Cultural depictions of James Dean
List songs